Human Ecology, Human Economy: Ideas for an Ecologically Sustainable Future is a 1997 book edited by Mark Diesendorf and Clive Hamilton. The authors' intent is to "develop some of the basic ideas, concepts and tools that are needed to create a set of preferred futures for the Earth". According to the editors, the book provides equal measures of human ecology and ecological economics, in order to assist the process of working towards a better future.

Human Ecology, Human Economy has been reviewed in Ecological Economics and The Australian Journal of Agricultural and Resource Economics.

See also
List of Australian environmental books
Sustainability
Ecologically sustainable development

References

Environmental non-fiction books
1997 non-fiction books
Allen & Unwin books
1997 in the environment
Energy economics
Technology in society
Sustainability books
Ecological economics
Australian non-fiction books
Books by Clive Hamilton
Books about globalization